A pyrin domain (PYD, also known as PAAD/DAPIN) is a protein domain and a subclass of protein motif known as the death fold, the 4th and most recently discovered member of the death domain superfamily (DDF). It was originally discovered in the pyrin protein, or marenostrin, encoded by MEFV. The mutation of the MEFV gene is the cause of the disease known as Familial Mediterranean Fever. The domain is encoded in 23 human proteins and at least 31 mouse genes.

Proteins containing a pyrin domain are frequently involved in programmed cell death processes including pyroptosis and apoptosis.  Proteins that possess a pyrin domain interact with the pyrin domains in other proteins to form of multi-protein complexes called inflammasomes and to trigger downstream immune responses.

Structure 
Pyrin domains are a ~90 amino acid motif present only at the N-terminus of proteins. The core is made of highly conserved hydrophobic residues surrounded by five or six alpha helices with α1→2 linkages. The hydrophobic core allows self-oligomerization into punctate or speck filamentous formations. Polar residues on the surface of the domain allow the formation of the characteristic homotypic PYD-PYD interactions. Acidic residues are typically located in the α2 and α3 helices while basic residues are located on the α1 and α4 helices. Compared to other members of the DDF they contain a distinctly elongated α2-α3 loop. This loop, especially α3, is highly variable among PYDs of different proteins which allows binding specificity with other PYDs of the same type.

Function 
Proteins containing PYD domains function as cytosolic pattern recognition receptors (PRRs) that sense danger-associated molecular patterns (DAMPs) and pathogen-associated molecular patterns (PAMPs). Homotypic interactions between PYD domains in receptor and adaptor proteins trigger downstream inflammasome formation.

First, receptor proteins (such as NLRs and ALRs) are activated by their putative DAMP or PAMP ligand. These receptors undergo a conformational change exposing their PYD domain. Generally, an adaptor protein (ASC) containing both a PYD and a caspase recruitment domain (CARD) is recruited forming a PYD-PYD electrostatic interaction with the receptor's domain. More ASC-PYDs spontaneously self-oligomerize and forming a multi-protein complex called an inflammasome. Pro-caspase-1 and caspase-8 are activated through an induced proximity mechanism. Caspases can then cascade to multiple downstream pathways to trigger pyroptosis and secretion of pro-inflammatory cytokines.

Types 
Types of proteins containing a PYD domain include an adaptor, apoptosis-associated speck-like protein containing a CARD (ASC), regulatory proteins like pyrin or pyrin-only proteins (POPs), receptors such as NOD-like receptors containing a pyrin domain (NRLPs) and AIM2-like receptors (ALRs).

ASC 
ASC is an adaptor protein and is part of apoptosis, pro-caspase 1 recruitment and activation, as well as NF-κB transcription factor activation. ASC contains only two domains: the PYD domain at the N-terminus and a CARD (caspase recruitment domain) at the C-terminus. Pyrin domain interactions between ASC leads to oligomerization forming puncta or "specks" that become visible microscopically. The CARD domain recruits pro-caspase-1 which undergoes proximity induced autocleavage to form the active caspase-1 which in turn triggers maturation of IL-1β and IL-18.

NLRPs 
NOD-like receptors exist in an inactive form until a conformational change is induced by their ligand. Some NLRs such as NLRP1 and NLRP2 have a straightforward mechanism by which the receptor binds to a PAMP triggering its activation, oligomerization and PYD-PYD ASC recruitment. In contrast, NLRP3 (also known as cryopyrin) is the most well-studied NLR with a pyrin domain and has several diverse agonists. Proposed methods of its activation are more nuanced with intermediate effectors instead of a direct ligand-receptor interaction. An efflux of ATP due to tissue damage leading to an increase in Ca2+, mitochondrial reactive oxygen species production due to cellular stress and lysosomal rupture releasing excess H+ have all been proposed to inhibit different cofactors that normally inactivate NLRP3.

ALRs 
Absent in melanoma 2-like receptors function as recognition of foreign double stranded DNA. Two ALRs with pyrin domains, AIM2 and IFI16, assemble inflammasomes; AIM2 in the cytosol and IFI16 moves between the nucleus and cytosol functioning as a nuclear pathogen sensor. Unlike NLRPs which function in cytosolic PAMP and DAMP recognition, ALRs mainly act within the nucleus oligomerizing along the DNA staircase.

POPs 
Pyrin-only proteins are unlike other PYD-containing proteins which contain a pyrin domain with one or more other domains. Different POPs have electrostatic and structural similarities to the specific pyrin domains they regulate. Most are encoded near the same genes as the pyrin-containing proteins they inhibit; POP1 and POP2 are postulated to have arisen by exon duplication. Since most inflammasomes are formed by aggregation due to PYD-PYD interactions, POPs instead bind to PYD domains preventing polymerization and therefore regulating and/or resolving inflammation response.

References 

Protein domains